The Jon Stickley Trio is a progressive ensemble from Asheville, North Carolina.  They are rooted in the traditions of bluegrass, but perform Gypsy jazz and folk-punk as well.  Jon Stickley plays flat-pick guitar; Lyndsay Pruett plays violin; Hunter Deacon plays drums.

References

American bluegrass music groups
Musical groups from Asheville, North Carolina